Hydnocarpic acid is an unsaturated fatty acid.  It differs from most fatty acids by having a cyclic ring system at the terminus, rather than being entirely straight chain.  It is found in the oil from plants of the genus Hydnocarpus from which it derives its name.

References

Fatty acids
Cyclopentenes